Olga Escalante (born 26 September 1962) is a Colombian sprinter. She competed in the women's 4 × 100 metres relay at the 1988 Summer Olympics.

References

External links
 

1962 births
Living people
Athletes (track and field) at the 1987 Pan American Games
Athletes (track and field) at the 1988 Summer Olympics
Colombian female sprinters
Olympic athletes of Colombia
Place of birth missing (living people)
Pan American Games competitors for Colombia
Olympic female sprinters
20th-century Colombian women